The firewood catfish (Sorubimichthys planiceps) a species of South American pimelodid catfish, is the sole member of the genus Sorubimichthys. Known by locals along the Amazon Basin as peixe-lenha, the firewood catfish is so called because it is of little eating value and is often dried and used for firewood.

Distribution and habitat
Firewood catfish occur in the Orinoco and Amazon Basins. It is normally found in whitewater high in suspended sediments.

Appearance and anatomy
This species attains about 150 cm (4 ft) in standard length.

These fish change in appearance as they grow. In adults, the upper jaw is extremely long, about one-third the length of the snout. The dorsum is ash-gray with darker spots. The sides have a white band, bordered below by a dark gray or brown band. The venter is usually white with some large spots. The dorsal fin and adipose fin are spotted. However, in juveniles, the snout is short and the pectoral fins are large and rounded. The white band does not appear until the fish is about 40 0m (1.6 in). The full adult color pattern and fin shapes appear by at least 20 cm (8 in).

Ecology
This fish is mainly nocturnal. Firewood catfish are highly predatory and feed on other fish.

References

firewood catfish
Fish of Bolivia
Freshwater fish of Brazil
Freshwater fish of Colombia
Freshwater fish of Ecuador
Freshwater fish of Peru
Fish of Venezuela
Fish of the Amazon basin
firewood catfish
firewood catfish